Étienne Marc Antoine Joseph de Grasse-Limermont (Toulon, 28 June 1757 – Saint-Nazaire, near Toulon, 20 February 1838) was a French Navy officer. He took part in the War of American Independence, earning a membership in the Society of Cincinnati. A Royalist, he betrayed France and was an aid to Trogoff when he surrendered Toulon and its fleet to the British. He remained employed by the British until 1814.

Biography 
Limermont was born to the family of Anne Gabrielle Françoise de Ricard de Tourtour, and of Captain Étienne de Grasse-Limermont. He joined the Navy as a Garde-Marine on 25 December 1771. He served on the frigate Aimable and took part in the Battle of Rhode Island on 29 August 1778.

On 29 April 1781, he captained the 18-gun cutter Pandour at the Battle of Fort Royal. In May 1781, he took part in the Invasion of Tobago, and was tasked with bringing news of the French victory back to France. The same year, he was promoted to Lieutenant. In April 1782, he was still in command Pandour, and he took part in the Battle of the Saintes.

He was promoted to Captain in 1792. The year after, he had command of the frigate Topaze.

During the Siege of Toulon, he fled with those of the French ships he had managed to surrender to the British. After Trogoff died in February, Limermont assumed command of the royalist squadron and sailed it to England.

He returned to France at the Bourbon Restauration, and was promoted to Contre-amiral, on 8 July 1816. He retired from the Navy the year after.

Sources and references 
 Notes

Citations

References
 
 
 

External links

 

French Navy officers
French military personnel of the American Revolutionary War